Monday demonstrations, peaceful political demonstrations that take place every Monday evening in Germany:

 Monday demonstrations in East Germany in 1989 and 1990, protests against the socialist government of the German Democratic Republic (GDR) 
 Monday demonstrations against cutbacks in social welfare, starting in 2004